The following highways are numbered 996:

Australia
C996 - Thames Promenade

United States